The white-bellied Luzon tree rat (Carpomys phaeurus) is a species of rodent in the family Muridae.
It is found only in Philippines.
Its natural habitat is subtropical or tropical dry forests.

References

Rats of Asia
Carpomys
Endemic fauna of the Philippines
Fauna of Luzon
Rodents of the Philippines
Mammals described in 1895
Taxa named by Oldfield Thomas
Taxonomy articles created by Polbot